Three Ages is a 1923 black-and-white American feature-length silent comedy film starring comedian Buster Keaton and Wallace Beery. The first feature Keaton wrote, directed, produced, and starred in (unlike The Saphead, in which he only acted), Keaton structured the film like three inter-cut short films. While Keaton was a proven success in the short film medium, he had yet to prove himself as a feature-length star. Had the project flopped, the film would have been broken into three short films, each covering one of the ages. The structure also worked as a parody of D. W. Griffith's 1916 film Intolerance.

Plot 

Three plots in three different historical periods—prehistoric times, Ancient Rome, and modern times (the Roaring Twenties)—are intercut to prove the point that man's love for woman has not significantly changed throughout history. In all three plots, characters played by the small and slight Buster Keaton and handsome bruiser Wallace Beery compete for the attention of the same woman, played by Margaret Leahy. Each plot follows similar "arcs" in the story line in which Keaton's character works for his beloved's attention and eventually wins her over.

In the Stone Age, Keaton competes with the bigger, brutish Beery for a cavewoman, Leahy. After observing another caveman drag away a woman by the hair in order to "claim" her, Keaton tries to become more assertive, but is continuously pushed back and bullied by Beery. An attempt to make Leahy jealous by flirting with another woman ends in failure. Nevertheless, Keaton grows closer to Leahy, and Beery challenges him to a fight at sunrise. Keaton wins thanks to hiding a rock in his club, but is caught and tied to the tail of an elephant to be dragged around the dirt as punishment. Upon his return, he finds Leahy about to be claimed by Beery and attempts to make off with her. Beery catches him and the two battle by tossing boulders at each other from afar, with Keaton and Leahy on a cliff together. When Beery climbs up to reclaim Leahy, Keaton dispatches Beery's cronies and finally defeats him. He drags a smitten Leahy off by the hair. In the epilogue, they go off for a walk with their huge family of children following them.

In the Ancient Rome segment, Keaton attempts to attract the attention of the wealthy Leahy, but is continually pushed back by Beery. Beery challenges him to a chariot race after a hard snow — Keaton wins by using sled dogs instead of horses. In revenge, Beery forces him into the lion pit belonging to Leahy's family. Keaton survives by befriending the lion and manicuring its claws. Keaton is rescued by Leahy's parents while Beery kidnaps Leahy. Keaton rescues her and tries to seduce her in her palanquin, which takes off without them. In the epilogue, they also go out for a walk with many children in tow.

In "modern times", Keaton is a poor man yearning for Leahy, who has rich parents. Leahy's mother, unimpressed with Keaton's bank account but interested in Beery's, decides on Beery as a match for her daughter. Keaton accidentally gets drunk at a restaurant where Beery and Leahy are dining, and Beery tricks the male half of another couple into punching Keaton, who stumbles home drunk. Later, Keaton impresses Leahy by playing a football game, whereas Beery is only a coach; Beery decides to play opposite Keaton. Keaton is overwhelmed by the bigger Beery, but ends up winning the game with an impressive touchdown. An irritated Beery frames Keaton for possession of alcohol and gets him arrested, simultaneously showing him a wedding announcement between him and Leahy — Keaton will be unable to stop the wedding while in jail. While shadowed by a guard, Keaton finds a criminal file showing that Beery has been charged with bigamy and forgery. He attempts to call Leahy to warn her. He accidentally escapes when the phone booth he is using is taken out for replacement. Keaton evades the police chasing him and makes it to the church in time to drag Leahy away from the wedding and into a cab. After showing her Beery's criminal file, he takes Leahy home and prepares to leave, but she kisses him. He declares to the cab driver that they are going back to the church. In the epilogue, they also go out for a walk — this time with their dog instead of children.

Cast 
Buster Keaton as the Boy
Margaret Leahy as the Girl
Wallace Beery as the Villain
Joe Roberts as the Girl's Father
Lillian Lawrence as the Girl's Mother
Kewpie Morgan as the Emperor / Cave Man / Roman Thug (as Horace Morgan)

Reception
In his October 1923 Life magazine review, Robert E. Sherwood wrote, "Although one has considerable difficulty in following the weird meanderings of Buster's plot (if any), one has no trouble whatsoever in greeting his antics with a hearty laugh. Of the three ages, the cave-man part is easily the most comic."

The December 1923 issue of Photoplay said of the film, "It has its good spots, but is below Buster's standard."

More recently, Dennis Schwartz felt that "Though overloaded with too much of a narrative for a Keaton comedy, some flashes of the Keaton genius ."

Preservation status
A caption at the beginning of the Rohauer Collection print of the film states that when the film's negative was rediscovered in 1954, it was so badly decomposed as to be considered unsalvageable. Subsequent restoration work preserved the film for posterity, although a good deal of damage is still evident.

See also
Buster Keaton filmography
Anachronism
Caveman archetype
Cinema of the United States

References

External links

 
 
 
 Lantern slide at silenthollywood.com
 Three Ages at the International Buster Keaton Society

1923 comedy films
1923 films
1920s American films
American black-and-white films
American silent feature films
Articles containing video clips
Films about cavemen
Films directed by Buster Keaton
Films directed by Edward F. Cline
Films produced by Joseph M. Schenck
Films with screenplays by Buster Keaton
Films with screenplays by Jean Havez
Films set in ancient Rome
Films set in prehistory
Films set in the 1920s
Films using stop-motion animation
Silent American comedy films